Richard Poplak is a Johannesburg-based South African author, journalist and film maker who focuses on corporate criminality, race and equity issues.

He is the author of the 2011 graphic journalistic novel Kenk: A Graphic Portrait about notorious Toronto bike thief Igor Kent. He is the co-director of Influence documentary about corruption in South Africa.

Early life and education 
Poplak was born in Johannesburg. He studied fine art and film making at Concordia University.

Career 
Poplak is the author of the 2011 journalistic comic book Kenk: A Graphic Portrait.

He is a senior contributor to the Daily Maverick.

Selected publications 

 Richard Poplak and Diana Neille, (directors) Influence (film) documents corruption and disinformation campaigns in South Africa government and the role of Bell Pottinger in supporting them
 Richard Poplak and Kevin Bloom, Continental Shift: A Journey into Africa's Changing Fortunes, 2016 Portobello Books, ISBN 9781846273742
 Richard Poplak, Ja  No Man: Growing Up White in Apartheid Era South Africa, 2007, Penguin Canada ISBN 0143050443
 Richard Poplak, Kenk: A Graphic Portrait, 2010, Pop Sandbox, ISBN 978-0986488405

Awards 
Poplak's book Ja No Man made the 2008 Alan Paton Non-Fiction prize long list and the Now (newspaper) Top 10 books of 2007.

References 

Living people
South African writers
South African film directors
Concordia University alumni
People from Johannesburg
Year of birth missing (living people)
Graphic novelists